This article is about the video game market and culture in Lithuania.

Production

Game companies from Lithuania

 A-Steroids
 Estoty
 Explosive Squat Games (Publisher & dev)
 Flazm
 Game Insight
 Glera Games
 Hidden Layer Games
 Karaclan
 Kiork
 Kodo Linija
 No Brakes Games
 Nordcurrent
 On5 Games
 Real Welders
 Realore
 SneakyBox
 Tag of Joy
 Tiny Magicians
 TutoToons
 Vidas Games
 Wireframe Dreams
 Zuurix

Titles from Lithuania

 Human: Fall Flat
 Cooking Fever
 RollerCoaster Tycoon 4 Mobile
 Inmost
 101-in-1 Sports Party Megamix
 Falling Stars
 FateLords
 Johnny Trigger
 The Howler
 Barbie as the Island Princess
 PSI: Syberian Conflict
 Murder In The Alps: Hidden Mystery
 Vampire Rush
 VED

Gaming media and news
GameblogLT http://www.gameblog.lt/

References

Lithuanian games